Johann Georg II, Duke of Saxe-Eisenach (24 July 1665, in Friedewald – 10 November 1698, in Eisenach), was a duke of Saxe-Eisenach.

He was the second son of Johann Georg I, Duke of Saxe-Eisenach and Johannetta of Sayn-Wittgenstein.

The death of his older brother, Frederick August—who was killed in battle in 1684—make him the new heir of the duchy of Saxe-Eisenach. Two years later (1686), Johann Georg succeeded his father when he died.

In Kirchheim unter Teck on 20 September 1688 Johann Georg married with Sophie Charlotte of Württemberg. This union was childless.

When his cousin, the young Duke Johann Wilhelm of Saxe-Jena died (1690) Johann Georg inherited a part of his duchy, because he was compelled to make a divisionary treaty with the Duke Wilhelm Ernst of Saxe-Weimar, his other cousin and brother-in-law of the late duke.

Johann Georg died suddenly of smallpox, and was succeeded by his brother, Johann Wilhelm.

House of Wettin
1665 births
1698 deaths
People from Altenkirchen (district)
Dukes of Saxe-Eisenach